Harrietsham is a rural and industrial village and civil parish in the Maidstone District of Kent, England noted in the Domesday Book. According to the United Kingdom Census 2001, it had a population of 1,504, increasing to 2,113 at the 2011 Census.

History
Harrietsham is noted in the Domesday Book.

In mediaeval times the manor of Harrietsham passed through a succession of families, including the Adam family of Essex. The manor subsequently passed from Stephen Adam to his sister Eve, wife of John Levett of Hollington, East Sussex. On Levett's death, his widow remarried Laurence Ashburnham, Gent., of Broomham, Sussex, ancestor of the Ashburnham baronets, bringing the manor of Harrietsham into the Ashburnham family.

The village contains a number of listed buildings, the most important of which architecturally are The Old House in East Street and the Saxon Church of St John the Baptist, which are both listed Grade I. The village also includes a church dedicated to St Peter, a Roman Catholic church and several nonconformist churches.

The Olympic Torch of London 2012 travelled through Harrietsham.

Geography
The village is bypassed by the A20 road between Maidstone and Ashford, although at one time all traffic passed through it. 
Harrietsham railway station serves the village. Both the M20 motorway and High Speed 1 pass through the parish. The large Marley works to the east of the centre detract from the rural tranquility as well as the transport corridor.

The River Len flows through the village south of the M20, on which is located Holme Mill.

References

External links
 

Civil parishes in Kent
Villages in Kent